Lady-Go-Round is the third single by B'z, released on February 21, 1990, and the only single from their 1990 album, Break Through. It was the first B'z song to chart, peaking at #39 at Oricon Charts, also selling over 25,000 copies during its chartrun.

The song also appears on the EP Wicked Beat as a heavily reworked "W-Style" version with both English and Japanese lyrics and different guitar solos by Tak Matsumoto.

Track listing
Lady-Go-Round
Love & Chain

References

1990 singles
B'z songs
Songs written by Tak Matsumoto
Songs written by Koshi Inaba
1990 songs
BMG Japan singles